Opus was a Yugoslav progressive rock band formed in Belgrade in 1973. Opus was a prominent act of the 1970s Yugoslav rock scene.

Formed and led by former YU Grupa keyboardist Miodrag "Mive" Okrugić, the band went through several lineup changes, its various lineups featuring notable musicians like guitarist Miodrag "Bata" Kostić, vocalist Dušan Prelević and guitarist Vidoja "Džindžer" Božinović. The band released only one studio album, ending their activity in 1979.

Band history
The band was formed in Belgrade in 1973 by Miodrag "Mive" Okrugić (a former YU Grupa member, keyboards), Miodrag "Bata" Kostić (a former Terusi and YU Grupa member, guitar) and Dušan Ćućuz (a former Džentlmeni member, bass guitar). The band chose their name after the song "Opus No. 1", which was written by Okrugić's during his work with YU Grupa. The song was often performed by YU Grupa, but never recorded. However, soon after it was formed, Opus disbanded and Ćućuz formed the symphonic rock band Tako.

In 1975, Okrugić reformed Opus. The new lineup featured Slobodan Orlić (a former Plamenih 5, Siluete, Bitnici and Moira member, bass guitar), Ljubomir Jerković (drums) and Dušan Prelević (a former Korni Grupa member, vocals). This lineup released the album Opus 1. The album, released in luxurious sleeve designed by Dragan S. Stefanović, featured symphonic rock-oriented songs. The album featured "Opus No. 1", renamed to "Opus \ Žena tame" ("Opus \ Woman of Darkness"), the songs "Dolina bisera" ("Valley of Pearls") and "Viđenje po Grigu" ("Seeing by Grieg"), released on the 7-inch single, and the song "Memento Mori", which featured Dah member Zlatko Manojlović on vocals. However, the album was not well received, as the critics expected more from the band on the basis of their live performances, and Opus disbanded once again.

In 1977, Okrugić once again reformed Opus. The lineup featured Okrugić, Orlić, Želimir Vasić (drums) and Milan Matić (guitar). After the reunion, the band released the single "Ne dam da budeš srećna" ("I Won't Let You Be Happy") and went through numerous lineup changes. The last lineup featured Okrugić, Orlić, Vladan Dokić (drums), Zoran Dašić (guitar), Vidoja "Džindžer" Božinović (a former Pop Mašina member, guitar), and Dragan Baletić (a former Crni Biseri member, vocals). The band finally ended their activity in 1979.

In 2013, Opus 1 was reissued on both CD and vinyl by Austrian record label Atlantide.

Discography

Studio albums
Opus 1 (1975)

Singles
"Veče" / "Sam" (1974)
"Dolina bisera" / "Viđenje po Grigu" (1975)
"Ne dam da budeš srećna" / "Ona je dama" (1977)

References

External links
Opus at Discogs
Opus at Prog Archives

Serbian progressive rock groups
Yugoslav progressive rock groups
Musical groups from Belgrade
Musical groups established in 1973
Musical groups disestablished in 1979